Limax dacampi (by other authors Limax dacampoi) is a species of air-breathing land slug, a terrestrial pulmonate gastropod mollusk in the family Limacidae, the keelback slugs.

Etymology
Luigi Menegazzi named this species in honor of the malacologist Benedetto Da Campo.

Taxonomy
For the time being, this is a problematic taxon; it may be a complex of closely related species. Limax dacampi is definitely not a synonym of Limax cinereoniger or Limax maximus; it is a separate species. This species was recently again found at the type locality near Garda (VR) (Lake Garda, Italy) and the copulatory behavior has been documented. The copulation of Limax dacampi is broadly similar to that of Limax maximus, but shows its own distinctive characteristics.

Description
The body is reddish with two dark bands along the sides or dark spots on the back, excluding the mantle. The head and tentacles are grayish. The sole is light-colored.

Distribution
This species is known to occur in the northern Italian mainland and in southern Switzerland.

Habitat
The species is found in a variety of habitats. It prefers moist and shady forests and bushland.

Subspecies and varieties
The species has been divided into several subspecies and numerous varieties. Some of these subspecies and varieties may be distinct species (or subspecies) within the species complex Limax dacampi.
 
 Limax dacampi menegazzii Lessona & Pollonera
 Limax dacampi menegazzii var. amaliaeBettoni
 Limax dacampi menegazzii var. punctatus Lessona
 Limax dacampi renieri Lessona & Pollonera
 Limax dacampi renieri var. atratus Bettoni
 Limax dacampi renieri var. elegans Bettoni
Limax dacampi renieri var.sordellii Bettoni
 Limax dacampi renieri var. nigricans Lessona
 Limax dacampi renieri var. sulphureus Lessona
 Limax dacampi renieri var. calderinii Lessona
 Limax dacampi dacampi Menegazzi
 Limax dacampi dacampi var. typus Bettoni
 Limax dacampi dacampi var. trilineolatus Bettoni
 Limax dacampi dacampi var. monolineatus Bettoni
 Limax dacampi dacampi var. pinii Lessona & Pollonera
 Limax dacampi dacampi var. fuscus Bettoni
 Limax dacampi dacampi var. taccanii Pini
 Limax dacampi dacampi var. gualterii Pini
 Limax dacampi dacampi var. maculatus Lessona
 Limax dacampi dacampi var. pallescens Lessona
 Limax dacampi dacampi var. rufescens Lessona
 Limax dacampi dacampi var. monocromus Lessona & Pollonera
 Limax dacampi dacampi var. villae Pini
 Limax dacampi dacampi var. turatii Pini

Bibliography
 This article has been expanded using, inter alia, material based on a translation of an article from the Deutsch Wikipedia, by the same name.
 Betta, Edoardo de 1870: I molluschi terrestri e fluviatili della provincia Veronese. A complemento della malacologia di L. Menegazzi. S.1-167, Verona, Vicentini & Franchini. Online Göttinger Digitalisierungszentrum (S.23)
 Bettoni, Eugenio 1871: Sul Limax Da-Campi, note malacologiche. Bullettino Malacologico Italiano, 3(5): 161-166, Taf. 3,4, Pisa. Online Biodiversity Heritage Library
 Bourguignat, Jules René 1861: Note sur divers limaciens nouveaux ou peu connus. Revue et Magasin de Zoologie pure et appliquée, (2) 13: 251-263, Paris [Online Biodiversity Heritage Library] (S.257/8).
 Bourguignat, Jules René 1862. Les spiciléges malacologiques. S.I-VII, S.1-287, Taf.1-15, Paris, Baillière. Online Google Books (S.25)
 Lessona, Mario & Carlo Pollonera 1882: Monografia dei limacidi italiani. S.1-82, Taf.1-3. Turin, Loescher. Online Biodiversity Heritage Library
 Menegazzi, Luigi 1855: Malacologia veronese. Rapporto letto nella tornata del 14 settembre 1854. Memorie dell' Accademia d' Agricoltura Commercio ed Arti di Verona, 32: I-XIII, S.1-334, Taf. I-II, Verona, 1855 Online  GDZ
 Manganelli, G., Bodon, M., Favilli, L. & Giusti, F. 1995. Fascicolo 16. Gastropoda Pulmonata. In: Minelli A., Ruffo, S. & La Posta, S.: Checklist delle specie della fauna italiana. S. 1-60, Bologna, Ed. Calderini.

External links
 Fauna Europaea
 Biolib
 Animalbase
 Molluschi continentali italiani
 Molluscs of Central Europe
 Clemens M. Brandstetter Gallery of Limax

Limacidae
Gastropods described in 1854